This is a list of holidays in the Pitcairn Islands.

Commemoration days
 25 April - ANZAC Day
 11 November - Remembrance Day

See also

Public holidays in Australia
Public holidays in the United Kingdom

References

External links

Pitcairn Islands culture
Pitcairn Islands
Public holidays in the United Kingdom
Pitcairn Islands